Charneca de Caparica is a former civil parish in the municipality of Almada, Lisbon metropolitan area, Portugal. In 2013, the parish merged into the new parish Charneca de Caparica e Sobreda. The population in 2011 was 29,763, in an area of 23.14 km2.

References

External links
Official website 

Former parishes of Almada